B. Joseph Pine (born 1958) is an American author. He coined the "experience economy".

Bibliography
Mass Customization: The New Frontier in Business Competition, 1992
Do You Want to Keep Your Customers Forever?, B. Joseph Pine II, Don Peppers, Martha Rogers, Harvard Business Review Classics (Originally published in Harvard Business Review in March 1995), 2010
The Experience Economy: Work is Theatre & Every Business a Stage, B. Joseph Pine, James H. Gilmore, 1999
Authenticity: What Consumers Really Want, 2007

Video 
 TED Talks, 2009
 Yes, And, 2006

References

Sources 
 Design & Emotion - Interview with Joseph Pine - Getting Emotional With... Joe Pine (2010) URL: http://www.design-emotion.com/2010/06/22/getting-emotional-with-joe-pine/

Living people
American business writers
1958 births